Marion Böker is a German women's rights leader and human rights expert who serves as the 16th President of the International Alliance of Women (IAW).

She holds a master’s degree in modern history and mass communication. She has worked as a lecturer in politics and later as a consultant focusing on implementing human rights. She has published several books and articles.

Böker has been active within UN WOMEN Germany, the German Women's Council, the CEDAW Alliance of Germany, and the Alliance for UNSCR 1325 in Germany. She has served on the international board of the International Alliance of Women and became President in 2021. In 2021 she took part in a CSW forum hosted by IAW on the importance of the women's movement countering "anti-trans voices [that] are becoming ever louder and [that] are threatening feminist solidarity across borders," where she discussed her trans-inclusive position.

References

International Alliance of Women people
Living people
Year of birth missing (living people)
German women's rights activists
21st-century German writers
21st-century German women writers